Soulmates is an American science fiction television anthology series created by William Bridges and Brett Goldstein. Soulmates premiered on AMC on October 5, 2020. In August 2020, the series was renewed for a second season, ahead of the series premiere. In February 2023, the series was cancelled after one season.

Premise
Soulmates is set approximately 15 years in the future, when a company called Soul Connex has developed a test that can determine the person you were most meant to love with 100% accuracy. People who take the test either learn of their soulmate and have the choice to pursue that person, or get a response of, "Your soulmate hasn't tested yet." The series explores through self-contained episodes whether love is destiny or a choice. Says series co-creator Will Bridges, "Your soulmate is the person you will love the most, more than anyone else. A soulmate isn't someone who is going to fix you. It's the person you will feel love for the strongest, and it’s undeniable. Does that mean true happiness, or the best person for you?"

Cast
 Sarah Snook as Nikki (episode 1)
 Kingsley Ben-Adir as Franklin (episode 1)
 Dolly Wells as Jennifer (episode 1)
 Anna Wilson-Jones as Rose (episode 1)
 Emily Bevan as Adele (episode 1)
 David Costabile as David Maddox (episode 2)
 Karima McAdams as Sarah Maddox (episode 2)
 Sonya Cassidy as Allison Jones (episode 2)
 Henry Goodman as Walter Gaskell (episode 2)
 Laia Costa as Libby (episode 3)
 Georgina Campbell as Miranda (episode 3)
 Emily Bruni as Co-worker (episode 3)
 Shamier Anderson as Adam (episode 3)
 Bill Skarsgård as Mateo (episode 4)
 Nathan Stewart-Jarrett as Jonah (episode 4)
 Fátima Molina as Natalia (episode 4)
 Malin Åkerman as Martha (episode 5)
 Charlie Heaton as Kurt Shepard (episode 5)
 Charlotte Spencer as Heather (episode 5)
 Joe Anderson as Travis (episode 5)
 Steven Mackintosh as Brother Samson (episode 5)
 Betsy Brandt as Caitlin Jones (episode 6)
 JJ Feild as Nathan (episode 6)
 Tom Goodman-Hill as Doug (episode 6)

Episodes

References

External links
 
 
 

2020 American television series debuts
2020 American television series endings
2020s American anthology television series
AMC (TV channel) original programming
English-language television shows
Television series by Banijay